opened in Eniwa, Hokkaidō, Japan in 1990. The display is organized in accordance with six main themes: the land, early peoples (Jōmon, Zoku-Jōmon, and Satumon cultures), Ainu homeland, opening up the land, the birth of the village of Eniwa, and post-war. The collection includes an assemblage of Jōmon-period artefacts from the Karinba ruins that has been designated an Important Cultural Property.

See also
 List of Cultural Properties of Japan - archaeological materials (Hokkaidō)
 List of Historic Sites of Japan (Hokkaidō)
 Hokkaido Museum

References

External links
 Eniwa City Historical Museum

Eniwa, Hokkaido
Museums in Hokkaido
Museums established in 1990
1990 establishments in Japan